= Nine Sons of Dan =

Australian band

- Origin: Coffs Harbour, Australia
- Genres: Rock; Pop
- Years active: 2008–2018
- Label: AAA Entertainment
- Members: Jay Bainbridge; Daniel Cox; Alex Pundyk; Wil Edgar; Morgan 'Flakey' Blake
- Website: ninesonsofdan.com

Nine Sons of Dan is a band originating from Coffs Harbour on the North Coast of NSW, Australia, it consists of members Jay Bainbridge, Daniel Cox, Alex Pundyk, Wil Edgar, and Morgan Blake.

The band has left a big impression on the Australian public by being dubbed, "the next big thing" by 102.9 Hot Tomato, when beating 200 bands in their Uncovered Competition. Since then they have released 2 singles, and an extended play disk called 'Landslide'. They have performed concerts at Coffs Harbour, and Brisbane, as well as performing as part of the Gold Coast 2011 Big Day Out line up. Since releasing their track 'She's So Fine' to commercial radio in December 2011, it was the #1 most added track to Australian Radio.

The band released both their first single 'Cities' and EP 'Landslide' in November 2010, the band since then has been gaining popularity and released their second single 'She's So Fine' on 6 January 2012. Their most recent release 'Follow The Blood' is a collection of the songs they always wanted to have on their records.

While the band was looking for a title, Pundyk and Flake were at university and hung out with a bunch of students from abroad, and they had this little group of friends to hang with and there were nine of them. They would always go to Dan Murphy's liquor store, which was located just next to their university. One day, their roommate literally said out of nowhere, why don't you call yourselves "Nine Sons of Dan".

== Members ==
- Jay Bainbridge, the vocalist, is the youngest member of the band
- Daniel Cox, the lead guitarist
- Alex Pundyk, the rhythm guitarist
- Wil Edgar, the bassist, joined in late 2010
- Morgan 'Flakey' Blake, the drummer

== Discography ==
Extended plays

- Landslide (November 2010)
- The New Kids (June 2012)
- Follow The Blood (May 2014)

Singles

- Cities (November 2010)
- She's So Fine (January 2012)
- Diamond Skin (April 2012)
- Fun (La Da Da Da Da) (January 2013)

Video Clips

- Cities (19 August 2010)
- She's So Fine (7 April 2011)
- Speed Dial (22 July 2011)
- Diamond Skin (1 May 2012)
- Fun (La Da Da Da Da) (15 February 2013)
- Wrecking Ball (4 April 2014)
